Natalia Más Masdefiol (born 11 August 1963) is a Spanish former swimmer who competed in the 1980 Summer Olympics. She competed in the Women's 100 metre freestyle, 200 metre freestyle, 400 metre freestyle, and 4x100 metre freestyle relay. Natalia and her teammate Laura Flaqué were the youngest swimmers from Spain to compete at the 1980 Summer Olympics, at 16 years of age.

Notes

References

External links
 
 
 
 

1963 births
Living people
Spanish female freestyle swimmers
Olympic swimmers of Spain
Swimmers at the 1980 Summer Olympics
Swimmers at the 1979 Mediterranean Games
Mediterranean Games competitors for Spain
20th-century Spanish women